The Roman Catholic Diocese of Litomyšl (Czech; Leitomischl in German) was a medieval Latin Catholic bishopric in Litomyšl, Bohemia (then Holy Roman Empire, now Czech Republic) and remains a Latin Catholic titular see.

History 
 On April 30, 1344 the Diocese of Litomyšl / Leitomischl (in Czech) / Lutomislen(sis) (Latin adjective) was established as the second bishopric in Bohemia, on territory split off from the first, the then Diocese of Prague (Praha).
 In 1474 it was suppressed and its territory merged back into the (meanwhile Metropolitan) Archdiocese of Prague.

Ordinaries 
(all Roman Rite)

Suffragan Bishops of Leitomischl/ Litomyšl
 Jan, Norbertines (O. Praem.) (April 30, 1344 – death 1353)
 Petr Jelito (June 9, 1368 – October 13, 1371), next Metropolitan Archbishop of Magdeburg (Germany) (October 13, 1371 – 1381), Archbishop-Bishop of Olomouc (Olmütz, Moravia, Czech Republic) (1381–1387)
 Jan Soběslav (1380–1387), next Bishop of Olomouc (1387–1387)
 Jan Václav (April 28, 1389 – death 1391)
 Johann von Bucka, O. Praem. (1392 – February 14, 1418 see below), next Bishop of Olomouc ([September 21, 1416] February 14, 1418 – death October 9, 1430) but also Apostolic Administrator of Litomyšl (February 14, 1418 – 1420), Apostolic Administrator of Roman Catholic Archdiocese of Prague (August 13, 1421 – October 9, 1430), created Cardinal-Priest of S. Ciriaco alle Terme Diocleziane (May 27, 1426 – death October 9, 1430), Apostolic Administrator of Vác (Hungary) (1429 – October 9, 1430)Apostolic Administrator Johann von Bucka, O. Praem. (see above February 14, 1418 – 1420) 
 Aleš z Březí (May 13, 1420 – death 1441)
 Matěj Kučka, O. Praem. (1441 – death 1449)
 Jan Bavor, O. Praem. (November 16, 1474 – 1478?).

Titular see 
In 1970 the diocese was nominally restored as Titular bishopric of Litomyšl / Leitomischl / Lutomislen(sis) (Latin adjective).

It has had the following incumbents, so far of the fitting Episcopal (lowest) rank :
 Jaroslav Škarvada (December 18, 1982 – death June 14, 2010), as Auxiliary Bishop of Prague (December 18, 1982 – September 25, 2002)
 Pavel Konzbul (May 21, 2016 – ...), as Auxiliary Bishop of Brno (Brünn, Moravia) (May 21, 2016 – ...).

See also 
 List of Catholic dioceses in the Czech Republic

Sources and external links 
 GCatholic, with Google satellite photo - data for all sections

Catholic titular sees in Europe
Litomyšl